West Central Historic District may refer to:

West Central Historic District (Biloxi, Mississippi), listed on the NRHP in Mississippi
 West Central Historic District (Anderson, Indiana), listed on the NRHP in Indiana